The Americas Rugby League Championship is an international rugby league football tournament contested by originally contested by North America national rugby league teams. The tournament was created to follow the success of the Americas region of the 2017 Rugby League World Cup qualifying.

History

Background
Previously the only regular international competitions in North America were the Colonial Cup between the USA and Canada and the Caribbean Carnival Cup between Jamaica and Canada (2011–14). As part of the RLIFs policy of expansion and the introduction of a regular international calendar the America's Cup was established which gave the nations opportunity for regular competitive games.

2015–present
The tournament began in 2016 following the previous years successful North America qualification tournament for the 2017 World Cup. The tournament was held every year until 2018 when it switched to every two years however the 2020 edition was cancelled due to the COVID-19 pandemic. The tournament restared in 2023, and in years ahead of the world cup, the tournament has seen the winners of the previous year's South American Rugby League Championship compete in it as the tournament acts as North and South America's qualification to the World Cup.

Results

^Officially the 2017 Rugby League World Cup North American qualification tournament.

References

 
Rugby league international tournaments